Kristen Walker  is an Australian lawyer. She is a judge in the Court of Appeal of Victoria and former Solicitor-General of Victoria.

Early life
Walker's father was a barrister, and she had no intent of following his footsteps. She initially enrolled in engineering, before transferring to a double degree of science and law.

Lawyer
Following her studies at the Melbourne Law School, Walker was admitted as a barrister and solicitor in 1993. She became a judge's associate at the High Court of Australia to Sir Anthony Mason, who was the Chief Justice of Australia. She received a Master of Laws from University of Melbourne and Columbia Law School in New York and  worked as an academic in the US and at the University of Melbourne. She has taught and been published in areas of international, constitutional and human rights law.

Walker was admitted to the bar in 2004 and was appointed as a queen's counsel in 2014.

Walker was appointed as solicitor-General of Victoria in 2017.

She was appointed to the Victorian Court of Appeal with effect from 3 May 2021. Her appointment was announced on 13 April 2021.

Personal details
Walker and her partner Miranda Stewart (a professor at the Melbourne Law School) have one son.

References

Living people
Judges of the Supreme Court of Victoria
Solicitors-General of Victoria
Australian women lawyers
Lawyers from Melbourne
Year of birth missing (living people)
20th-century Australian lawyers
21st-century Australian judges